The Church of Saint Demetrius or the Church of the Holy Trinity was a Serbian Orthodox church in Budapest, Hungary, located in the Tabán area. It was built between 1742 and 1751 in Central European Baroque style by the Serbian community of Buda, and served as the co-cathedral of the Eparchy of Buda. The building was seriously damaged in the siege of Budapest in 1945, and the ruins were demolished in 1949.

History

Establishment and early history 
The first group of Serbian refugees arrived at Buda in the first half of November 1690. They belonged to the Great Migration of the Serbs from the Ottoman Empire to the Habsburg Empire led by Arsenije III Crnojević, the Archbishop of Peć and Serbian Patriarch. The Cameral Administration of Buda resettled almost 600 families in the part of the Lower Town between Castle Hill and Gellért Hill which had been destroyed during the siege of Buda in 1686. The new neighbourhood was called Tabán, or officially Ratzenstadt (Rácváros), i.e. the "town of the Serbs". The first census in 1696 found more than 1000 Serbian families in the Tabán (about 5000 people). The majority of the new settlers followed the Orthodox faith: 461 of the taxpayer heads of families belonged to the Serbian Orthodox Church and 250 were Catholics in 1702.

As the former Ottoman mosque of Pasha Sokollu Mustafa was converted into a Catholic church, the Serbs built their own temporary chapel nearby. Construction of a permanent church dedicated to Saint Demetrius began shortly after the Cameral Administration issued a permit on 23 September 1697. It was consecrated in 1698 by Arsenije III Crnojević although the tower was only added in 1716. The Tabán parish had a stavropegial status being directly under the jurisdiction the Patriarch. During the 18th century the Serbian community increased in number and wealth, and established its own institutions.

Due to the frequent floods of the Danube, the church soon went to ruin, and in 1738 the townspeople – in consultation with the Bishop of Buda, Vasilije Dimitrijević – made a decision to replace it with a more durable and monumental structure. The design of the new church was entrusted to architect Ádám Mayerhoffer whose contract was signed on 29 March 1741. The parish applied for a building permit on 12 August 1741 but the Council of Buda denied it because constructing new Orthodox churches was not allowed. The Serbs claimed that the project was in fact a reconstruction because the roof was leaking badly and the wooden upper parts of the existing building created a fire hazard.

The building permit was only issued on 28 April 1742. Construction work began on 1 May 1742, and the vault and the roof of the nave was already complete on 26 November. The original plans were slightly modified in the final build. Due to a shortage of money the new church was equipped with icons salvaged from the previous building between 1745 and 1747. In 1751 Bishop Dionisije Novaković consecrated the church to the Holy Trinity but a chapel on the loft was established in the honor of Saint Demetrius to carry on the tradition. The Tabán church was the largest church building in the whole Metropolitanate of Karlovci and the only one with two rows of windows.

At first the tower had a simple pyramidal roof clad with shingles but in 1775 a new copper spire was made. The richly decorated spire, designed by Mihajlo Sokolović, was one of the most beautiful Rococo church spires in Central Europe. A painted and gilt wood model was made by Joseph Leonard Weber in 1774 which still exists.

The surroundings of the church in the 18th century were narrow and cramped. In 1766 the Serbian community enlarged the churchyard and asked for a property-tax exemption arguing that the church was surrounded by "small hovels" and they could not even hold a procession. The houses in the vicinity were mainly built of wood or mudbricks. In 1769 the city block of the Serbian Orthodox church contained a house for the magistracy and the school and another for the schoolmaster and the sexton.

19th century 
The church was completely burned out in the Great Tabán Fire of 1810 which destroyed the whole district, "only its copper spire survived" as a contemporary report claimed. The reconstruction was a long process that began in 1811 and lasted until the early 1820s. The church was damaged again by the Great Flood of the Danube in 1838 when the water reached a height of 110 cm inside the building.

The surroundings of the cathedral has changed with the renewal of the area after the two disasters as a new square was created along the southern and eastern side of the church. It was called Kirchenplatz (Egyház tér) and served as the main square of the district. In this new setting the church had a narrow churchyard on the south and the east, and it was surrounded on the northern and western sides by an enclosed courtyard and smaller buildings owned by the Serbian parish.

At the end of October 1814 the three rulers of the Holy Alliance, King Francis I, King Frederick William III of Prussia and Emperor Alexander I of Russia visited Buda during the Congress of Vienna. Archduke Joseph, the Palatine of Hungary accompanied them to the Church of the Holy Trinity where the young priest, Jovan Vitković was his protégé. At 10.30am the church was full of spectators when the three rulers arrived. On the great occasion, Vitković delivered three orations: King Francis was greeted in Latin, the Emperor of Russia in Slavic and the King of Prussia in German.

The first half of the 19th century was the heyday of Serbian culture in Buda where local intellectuals established strong connections with the national awakening movement of the Hungarian Reform Era, and even took part in the literary and cultural debates of their Hungarian compatriots. They also paid attention to the national and cultural renaissance unfolding in Serbia, and were part of the Serbian enlightenment. Petar Vitković (Péter Vitkovics) was the priest of the Tabán church from 1803 until his death in 1808. He came from an old Serbian family in Eger but he left his hometown for Buda later in his life. An erudite and jovial man, and a polyglot speaking Serbian, Hungarian, German, Latin and Greek, he wrote several treatises and orations. His large personal library was destroyed in the fire of 1810. His elder son, Mihailo Vitković (Mihály Vitkovics) was a Serbian and Hungarian poet, translator and lawyer who carried an extensive correspondence with his prominent Hungarian contemporaries as well as Serbian writers and intellectuals. Mihailo's younger brother, Jovan Vitković (1785-1849) served as priest of the Tabán church after his father, and cultivated friendships with Benedek Virág, a Hungarian poet and historian living in Tabán, and Matija Petar Katančić, a Franciscan friar, pioneer archaeologist and Croatian writer. In the second half of the century Jeremija Mađarević (Jeremiás Magyarevics) served as priest of the parish from 1864 until 1896. He was loyal to the Hungarian state and was a long-standing member of the Legislative Committee of Budapest.

The housing stock of the Tabán gradually improved in the 19th century, especially after the unification of Pest and Buda in 1873 as Budapest grew into a booming modern capital during the age of the Dual Monarchy. In the late 1890s the Serbian Parish built a large new tenement house on a nearby lot which also served as the headquarters of the deanery. At the same time the church was restored in Neo-Baroque style. The urban context of the church changed fundamentally between 1898 and 1903 when the central part of the Tabán was rebuilt creating new roads and squares, demolishing the poorest quarters and even building a new bridge across the Danube.

20th century and destruction 
In 1907 the church got a new bell which was consecrated by Bishop Lukijan Bogdanović and it was first tolled on the 40th anniversary service of King Franz Joseph's coronation on 8 June. In the spring of 1916 the bells were requisitioned by the government and melted down for war uses. In 1933-1934 a large part of Tabán district was demolished by the municipality of Budapest but the church, which was still in use by the Eparchy of Buda, was preserved. The 1934 urban plan of the municipality foresaw the creation of a sunken courtyard around the church and a row of arches on the side of the planned new thoroughfare. However in the following years a new park was created on the site of the demolished district, and the excavated Tabán ruins were incorporated into the design of the green area. The last buildings around the church, including the large tenement house owned by the Serbian parish and the old parish house were demolished in 1938. In the last ten years of its existence the church was stranded in the middle of the park as almost every traces of the former Rácváros disappeared due to the large-scale demolitions. The Serbian Orthodox population in the area was also greatly reduced following these changes.

The building was seriously damaged in the siege of Budapest in 1944-45. The Rococo spire and the roof was destroyed, and parts of the vault fell down but the interior and the iconostasis survived the destruction. The liturgical objects and the paintings were saved by the last parish priest, Vujicsics Dusán (Dušan Vujičić). Although the church was not fit for use, the priest strongly opposed its demolition. In early 1946 György Zubkovics (Georgije Zubković), the Bishop of Buda asked the government for help but the municipality and the Fővárosi Közmunkatanács (Council of Public Works) was against the restoration the church. The urban planners at the time regarded the cathedral obsolete and a hindrance to the intended restructuring of the bridgehead area.

The ruined church was finally demolished in 1949. The cast iron railings of the churchyard were re-erected in the garden of the Serbian Orthodox Church of Budakalász, and a few pieces of furniture were moved by Vujicsics Dusán to the Serbian Orthodox Church in Pest. The area was landscaped but a little more than ten years later it was completely restructured again when the new Elisabeth Bridge was built. In 1962 new roads and a traffic interchange was built covering the land where the cathedral had stood. In 2014 a memorial bell was erected nearby which was created by Kristóf Petrika and László Rétháti. The bell is decorated with the coat-of-arms of the Eparchy of Buda and a Serbian inscription recalling the foundation and the destruction of the former Orthodox cathedral.

Architecture 

The Church of Saint Demetrius was a freestanding, single-nave Baroque church with a single western tower and an apse in the east. The walls were built of mixed stone and bricks. The western facade was divided into three vertical sections by simple lesenes. The slightly projecting central bay had segmental arched windows on three levels, the largest one on the first level was topped by a curved Baroque pediment with shell design. The side bays originally had four openings which were later replaced with false windows (these were also removed during the Neo-Baroque remodelling). The heavy cornice was supported by large projecting modillions. The western entrance was protected by an aedicular porch with two Ionic columns and a triangular pediment. The lower level of the tower was flanked by voluted gables with crosses, while the belfry on the upper level had four arched windows on each side with arched pediments and balconets. The corners were emphasized by Corinthian pilasters. The Rococo copper spire was decorated with flaming urns, rocaille ornaments and a lantern. Four turret clocks were set into the arched cornice of the tower.

The architecture of the side facades was similar with lesenes and two rows of superimposed segmental arched windows. The larger windows on the lower level were topped by pediments with shell design. The southern and northern side doors had red marble frames decorated with crosses. A few old gravestones were immured into the outer walls. The facades were enriched by the Neo-Baroque remodelling with new decorative elements like the heavy cornice and the railings of the balconets.

At the time of its construction the church was located in the middle of a city block, surrounded by the institutions of the Serbian Orthodox community. The dense urban grain of the neighbourhood was gradually broken up during the 19th century and finally the area was totally cleared in the 1930s creating a wholly new spatial situation where the church became a solitary building in a park.

Interior: The nave of the cathedral was three bays long, covered with Baroque Bohemian vaults, ending with a shallow apse in the east and a preceded by a vaulted narthex on the west. The double transverse arches sprung from pairs of Corinthian half pillars which had elaborate capitals decorated with festoons. The projecting cornice was strongly articulated. The organ loft above the western narthex opened to the nave by a large triumphal arch. A similar arch on the sanctuary side framed the iconostasis which dominated the view of the interior. 

The vault was decorated with frescos. In the first bay in front of the iconostasis there was God the Father standing on a celestial sphere raised by angels, and surrounded by the celestial forces arranged in nine groups. In the corners, the four evangelists were presented, together with their symbols: Matthew with an angel and Mark with a lion at his feet (northern side); John with an eagle and Luke in front of an easel, with the icon of the Virgin on it (the southern side). This was painted by Arsenije Teodorović in 1818, and the composition was similar to his previous work in the Almaška Church in Novi Sad.

Iconostasis 

The unusually large dimensions of the building presented a challenge to create a suitably large iconostasis separating the nave from the sanctuary. Due to financial difficulties the work only started a decade after the consecration of the church. On 16 July 1761 a contract was signed with Antonije Mihić, a woodcutter and carpenter from Pest. He not only created the high wooden frame of the iconostasis but also a pulpit, choir stalls on both sides of the altar for six persons, the archbishop's throne with a canopy, sixty stalls along the side walls and a tabernacle above the altar table. Mihić finished most of these works in the first half of 1764. The parish signed a contract with Vasilije Ostojić on 25 March 1764 to paint the icons.

The first iconostasis of the church is only known from descriptions but it seems that its conception strongly influenced the iconostasis of the Serbian Orthodox Cathedral in Szentendre, painted between 1777 and 1781. The co-cathedral in Buda certainly had an outstandingly representative Baroque interior suitable to its status as one of the most important churches in the Metropolitanate of Karlovci. However the Great Tabán Fire of 1810 destroyed the whole ensemble.

Second iconostasis

The wood frame of the second iconostasis was installed in 1815 after the necessary repairs of the interior had been completed. It was created by Petar Padić, a woodcarver from Eger who received the job in 1813 for 6,000 forints. Following the recommendation of the priest, Jovan Vitković, the parish board made a contract with Arsenije Teodorović on 28 May 1817 to paint 68 icons for the iconostasis and to gild their frames, together with the ornaments. He was commissioned to marble paint the proskomedia and the altar space and decorate its walls with three paintings. The first vault in front of the iconostasis was to be painted with a representation of God the Father in Majesty and the nine angelic orders. Two choir stalls were to be gilded and decorated with an icon painted on each of them. These works should have been executed "with diligent labor and all kinds of experience and skill of indefatigable care" within two years from May 1818. His remuneration was 9,000 forints in silver coins, and lodging was provided in Buda and 288 gallons of vine.

Teodorović was a renowned painter from Novi Sad who received his artistic education in the Academy of Fine Arts Vienna and worked in a refined Classicist style. He painted many iconostases for the Serbian Orthodox communities of the Habsburg Empire. This time he applied for the job at Jovan Vitković in a letter dated 10 April 1816 and enjoyed the confidence of both Bishop Dionisije Popović and Metropolitan Stefan Stratimirović. He has also known the Vitković family from Eger where he worked on the iconostasis in 1801.

In the end, Teodorović only began to work in August 1818 and finished the larger part of the iconostasis by September 1820. A few icons were made later in his workshop in Novi Sad, and sent to Buda during the course of 1821. The contract was ended on 23 September 1821. Although he was supposed to paint the icons "with his own hands", this was an unrealistic expectation on part of the parish because Teodorović worked with many assistants, and the less important details, the gilding and the background of the paintings were always entrusted to them.

The Buda iconostasis belonged to the group of tall, richly decorated, Ukrainian-type partition screens that appeared in the Metropolitanate of Karlovci in the middle of the 18th century. The icons on the two ends and the medallions of the highest zone were concave, creating an illusionistic impression that the iconostasis extended into the space of the observer. As regards the paintings, the lack of Baroque gestures and the calmness of their style reveals the artist's aspiration towards classical simplicity. Teodorović used engravings and woodcuts of Western artists from prayer books, illustrated Bibles and painter's pattern books as models for his compositions. The icons were arranged in four zones separated by horizontal beams: the Sovereign tier (with additional icons above the lintels of the doors and on the socle), the tier of Feasts, the tier of the Apostles and the great cross surrounded with two rows of medallions depicting scenes from the Passion of Christ and half-length figures of the prophets. The arrangement of icons and the program of the iconostasis focused on the most important topics of Serbian Orthodox theology in the 18th century: God's incarnation and redemption through Christ's sacrifice. The basic structure and the arrangement of the icons was almost identical to Teodorović's previous work, the iconostasis of the Church of the Holy Virgin in Zemun.

The icons

The choice and arrangement of the icons was traditional with a few deviations. The place to the left of the Mother of God is usually dedicated to the Patronal Saint or Feast but this was replaced by an icon of Saint Nicholas. The icon of the Holy Trinity was located instead in the middle of the iconostasis in the form of a large central painting. The celestial figures of Christ, the Theotokos, Archangel Michael and Gabriel are standing on clouds while the saints were shown in real, earthly space. The small icons on the socle were narratively and symbolically connected to the icons of the Sovereign tier: under the icon of Jesus Christ there was an episode from his life, the meeting with the Samaritan woman at the well; under John the Baptist his beheading was depicted. The presence of the Old Testament prophets of Moses and Aaron the tier of the Apostles is somewhat unusual. They illustrated the idea of the high priesthood that began with them, and continued through the apostles who founded the first Christian communities, and appointed the first bishops.

After the demolition of the church, the icons and a few pieces of the wood frame were preserved by the Eparchy of Buda. From 2012 to 2017 the icons were restored, documented and researched for the first time since the dismantling of the screen. The scientific project was a cooperation between the Museum of Serbian Church Art in Szentendre, the Gallery of Matica Srpska in Novi Sad and the Provincial Institute for the Protection of Cultural Monuments.

Socle (from left to right):
 Prophet Daniel in the lions' den
 The deliverance of Agrikov's son by Saint Nicholas
 Visitation
 Jesus and the Samaritan woman
 Beheading of St. John
 Three young men in the fiery furnace

Royal doors:
 Annunciation

Side doors:
 Holy Archangel Michael (north)
 Holy Archdeacon Stephen (south)

Sovereign tier (from left to right):
 Saint Demetrius
 Saint Nicholas
 Theotokos
 Jesus Christ
 John the Baptist
 Saint George

Above the lintels:
 Last Supper (above the Royal doors)
 The Entry of the Most Holy Theotokos into the Temple (above the north door)
 Birth of the Theotokos (above the south door)

Feasts tier (from left to right):
 The Transfiguration of Christ
 The Baptism of Christ
 Feast of the Presentation of Jesus at the Temple
 The Nativity
 Triumphal entry into Jerusalem
 The Resurrection of Christ
 The Ascension of Christ
 The Assumption of the Virgin

Large central painting (above the Royal doors):
 The Holy Trinity with angels

Tier of the Apostles (from left to right):
 Holy Prophet Moses
 Holy Apostles Matthias and Simon
 Holy Apostles Matthew and Bartholomew
 Holy Apostles James and Thomas
 Holy Apostles Peter and Paul
 Holy Apostles Andrew and Philip
 Holy Apostles Judas and James
 Holy Prophet Aaron

The Great Cross:
 The crucifixion of Christ

Around the Great Cross:
 Theotokos (first painting left)
 Saint John (first painting right)
 Mary Magdalene (second painting left)
 Saint Longinus (second painting right)
 Image of the Saviour Made Without Hands (under the Great Cross)

Inner row of medallions (from left to right):

Agony in the Garden, Arrest of Jesus, Christ before Annas, Christ before Caiaphas, Christ before Herod, Christ before Pilate, Pilate Washing his Hands, Flagellation of Christ, The Crowning with Thorns, Ecce Homo, The Way of the Cross (half of the painting was lost), Jesus Falls at the Cross

Outer row of medallions (from left to right):

Holy Prophet Isaiah, Holy Prophet Jeremiah, Holy Prophet Ezekiel, Holy Prophet Daniel, Holy Prophet Hosea, Holy Prophet Joel, Holy Prophet Amos, Holy prophets Obadiah and Jonah, Holy Prophet Micah, Holy Prophet Nahum, Holy Prophet Habakkuk, Holy Prophet Zephaniah, Holy Prophet Haggai, Holy Prophet Zechariah, Holy Prophet Malachi

Five more icons by Teodorović, that were not part of the iconostasis, also survived: 

King David (backs of the northern choir stalls), St. John of Damascus (backs of the southern choir stall), Annunciation, Adoration of the Magi (Proskomedia), The Virgin and Child (the Virgin's throne)

The fronts of the choir stalls were also decorated with icons that depicted Saint Ignatius of Antioch (north) and Saint Romanos the Melodist (south). As they are not known today, as well as any documentation about them, it remains unknown whether they were painted by Teodorović. Unusually the pulpit, which had been destroyed by the fire, was not replaced after the reconstruction. The Eleusa icon on the Virgin's throne was signed by the painter: "Created by Arsenije Teodorović, painter and citizen of Novi Sad in 1820". The Serbs in Buda had great respect for this icon, as shown by the numerous votive offerings (silver thalers, ducats, jewels) mentioned in the church inventories.

Parish priests 

List of parish priests:

 Petar Vitković (Péter Vitkovics) - 1803-1808
 Jovan Vitković (János Vitkovics) - 1808-1849
 Jovan Milikšić (János Miliksics) -  until 1864
 Jeremija Mađarević (Jeremiás Magyarevics) - 1864-1896
 Velimir Nedeljkovic (Velimir Nedelykovits) - 1898-1936
 Dušan Vujičić (Dusán Vujicsics) - 1939-1949

References 

Churches in Budapest
Churches completed in 1751
Demolished buildings and structures in Hungary
Buildings and structures destroyed during World War II
Tabán
Serbian Orthodox church buildings in Hungary
Buildings and structures demolished in 1949
Baroque church buildings in Hungary
18th-century churches in Hungary
18th-century Serbian Orthodox church buildings